Tim Guleri is an American venture capitalist and serial entrepreneur. He is the managing director of Sierra Ventures of San Mateo, California. Prior to joining Sierra Ventures, Guleri helped build Scopus Technology and founded Octane Software.

Early life and education
Tim Guleri received his Bachelor of Science degree in electrical engineering from Punjab Engineering College, Chandigarh, India. He received his master's degree in robotics and industrial engineering from Virginia Tech in 1988 and was inducted into the Academy of Distinguished Alumni in 2006. He sold books door to door to put himself through graduate school.

Career
In September 1989, Guleri became part of the information technology team at LSI Logic Corporation. In 1992, he joined Scopus Technology, a customer relationship management software company, where he was vice president of field operations until 1996. Scopus went public in 1995, and was acquired by Seibel Systems in 1998 for $750 million.

Guleri founded the ecommerce company Octane Software in 1997. He was the CEO of Octane until it sold to Epiphany, Inc. in 2000. Guleri led the merger of the two companies. and served as the executive vice president of Epiphany from March 2000 until February 2001. He joined Sierra Ventures, a venture capital fund, as managing director of the software team in 2001. At Sierra, Guleri worked with investments in software and open source development. Through his investments from Sierra, he has taken companies Sourcefire and MakeMyTrip public. In February 2014, Shape Security raised $40 million in Series C funding from Sierra Ventures and other funds.

Other activities
During his time at Sierra Ventures, Guleri has led investments and served on the board of directors for companies such as MakeMyTrip.com, an online flight booking service based in India, CodeGreen Networks, Approva, Ventaso, a business software company, Greenplum, Again Technologies, BINA Technologies and Sourcefire. He currently sits on the board of directors for companies including Treasure Data, LeadGenius, DotNetNuke, and Hired.com, a startup company that aims to make the job search and hiring employees easier.

See also
 List of venture capital firms

References

Living people
Year of birth missing (living people)
American venture capitalists
Punjab Engineering College alumni